St Margaret South Elmham is a village and civil parish in the north of the English county of Suffolk. It is one of the parishes surrounding Bungay which are known as The Saints.

The parish has a population of around 100. It borders the parishes of Flixton, St Cross South Elmham, St Peter South Elmham and All Saints and St Nicholas South Elmham. The parish council is operated jointly with Flixton and St Cross South Elmham. 

The village is spread along the road linking St Cross South Elmham with All Saints and St Nicholas South Elmham, with a small cluster of houses around St Magarets Green, an area of common land at the southern border of the parish. Other than a village hall and the parish church, the village has no services. 

The village church is dedicated to St Margaret. It has a Norman south doorway, a 14th-century tower and was restored during the 1870s. The church is a Grade I listed building. South Elmham Hall, a medieval moated site and former palace of the Bishop of Norwich, is on the eastern edge of the parish, extending into St Cross South Elmham. The site is a scheduled monument and the hall a Grade I listed building.

Notes

References

Villages in Suffolk
Civil parishes in Suffolk
Waveney District